Sophronica aurescens is a species of beetle in the family Cerambycidae. It was described by Stephan von Breuning in 1968.

References

Sophronica
Beetles described in 1968